The BRIT Awards (often simply called the BRITs) are the British Phonographic Industry's annual popular music awards. The name was originally a shortened form of "British", "Britain", or "Britannia" (in the early days the awards were sponsored by Britannia Music Club), but subsequently became a backronym for British Record Industry Trusts Show. In addition, an equivalent awards ceremony for classical music, called the Classic BRIT Awards, is held in May. The awards were first held in 1977 and originated as an annual event in 1982 under the auspices of the British record industry's trade association, the BPI. In 1989, they were renamed The BRIT Awards. Mastercard has been the long-term sponsor of the event.

The highest profile music awards ceremony in the UK, the BRIT Awards have featured some of the most notable events in British popular culture, such as the final public appearance of Freddie Mercury, the Jarvis Cocker protest against Michael Jackson, the height of a high-profile feud between Oasis and fellow Britpop band Blur, the Union Jack dress worn by Geri Halliwell of the Spice Girls, and a Chumbawamba member throwing a bucket of iced water over then-Deputy Prime Minister John Prescott. These moments took place in the 1990s when the ceremony had a reputation for being “a little shambolic, unpredictable and, at times, anarchic” with a criticism it has lost its edge since then and “evolved into a more polished, sanitised affair.”

The BRIT Awards were broadcast live until 1989, when Samantha Fox and Mick Fleetwood hosted a widely criticised show in which little went as rehearsed. From 1990 to 2006, the event was recorded and broadcast the following night. From 2007, The BRIT Awards reverted to a live broadcast on British television, on 14 February on ITV. That year, comedian Russell Brand was the host and three awards were dropped from the ceremony: British Rock Act, British Urban Act and British Pop Act. For the last time, on 16 February 2010, Earls Court in London was the venue for The BRITs. The BRIT Awards were held at the O2 Arena in London for the first time in 2011.

The BRIT Award statuette given to the winners features Britannia, the female personification of Britain. Since 2011, the statuette has been regularly redesigned by well known British artists, architects, and designers including Vivienne Westwood, Damien Hirst, Tracey Emin, Peter Blake, Zaha Hadid, Anish Kapoor, David Adjaye, Yinka Ilori and Es Devlin, Pam Hogg, and Oluola Slawn. In 1992, KLF opened the show and invited extreme metal band Extreme Noise Terror on stage, complete with flame-throwers, and fired machine gun blanks over the crowd. The group sent a dead sheep to the aftershow party, and later buried their BRIT Award statuette at Stonehenge signifying their abhorrence of the music industry. Robbie Williams holds the record for the most BRIT Awards, 13 as a solo artist and another five as part of Take That. Girl group Little Mix made history at the Brit Awards 2021, when they became the first female group to receive the award for Best Group at the ceremony after 43 years since it was first introduced.

Ceremonies

The first awards ceremony was in 1977, as "The BRITish Record Industry BRITannia Awards", to mark the Queen's Silver Jubilee and was televised by Thames Television. There has been an annual ceremony since 1982.

Broadcast
The 1988 BPI Awards was the first of the ceremonies to be broadcast on live television. The BBC had previously broadcast the ceremony from 1985, with the shows from 1982 to 1984 not broadcast on television. The BBC continued to broadcast the renamed BRIT Awards, live in 1989 and pre-recorded from 1990 to 1992. ITV have broadcast the awards since 1993, pre-recorded until 2006 and live from 2007 onwards. BBC Radio 1 has provided backstage radio coverage since 2008.

For many years, ITV have aired a launch show in January titled The BRITs Are Coming, which reveals some of the artists who have been nominated at the upcoming ceremony. Previous hosts include Jonathan Ross and Kate Thornton. The 2013, 2014 and March 2021 host was Nick Grimshaw, followed by Reggie Yates and Laura Whitmore in 2015 and 2016 respectively. Emma Willis hosted The BRITs Are Coming in 2017 and again in 2018 when it was broadcast live for the first time. Clara Amfo hosted the 2019 launch show and Alice Levine hosted in 2020. Grimshaw hosted the March 2021 The Brits Are Coming with Griff. The December 2021 launch show was hosted by Amfo and Maya Jama.

The 2023 edition will take place on 11 February 2023 and it will be held, for the first time, on a weekend. The nominees for 2023 were announced via the BRITs social platforms on 12 January 2023 by Jack Saunders and Vick Hope.

List of ceremonies

BPI Awards

BRITs

Notes

Notable moments

Electricians' strike (1987)
In 1987 the BPI Awards ceremony was held in the Great Room at the Grosvenor House Hotel. At the time there was a BBC electricians' strike in effect, and the organisers decided to use a non-TV events production company, called Upfront, to manage the show. Despite the show being picketed, the event was transmitted as intended. For a while, the outdoor broadcast scanner was rocked on its wheels by the protesters and they managed to shut off the power to one of the big GE video screen projectors. Upfront was then asked to organise the following year and persuaded the BPI to move the event to a larger venue, starting the trend that continues to this day, albeit at The O2, and with a different production company (MJK Productions).

Samantha Fox and Mick Fleetwood (1989)

In 1989, the ceremony was broadcast live and presented by Fleetwood Mac's Mick Fleetwood and singer Samantha Fox. The inexperience of the hosts, an ineffective autocue, and little preparation combined to create an unprofessional show that was poorly received. The hosts continually got their lines mixed up, a pre-recorded message from Michael Jackson was never transmitted and several guest stars arrived late on stage or at the wrong time, such as Boy George in place of The Four Tops.

Andy Bell and Boy George embrace (1989)
In accepting the award for British Group from Boy George at the 1989 awards, Andy Bell of Erasure kissed George on stage to cheers from the crowd, with Bell stating it was an act in protest against Section 28 introduced by Margaret Thatcher's Conservative government that prohibited the "promotion" of homosexuality in schools.

Freddie Mercury's final public appearance (1990)
The 1990 awards ceremony saw the last public appearance of Queen frontman Freddie Mercury. Queen appeared at the ceremony to receive the Outstanding Contribution to Music. Mercury (who had been suffering from AIDS since 1987 but had not disclosed it to the public) did not make a speech, as Brian May did the talking on behalf of the other members, but his gaunt appearance was noticeable.

The KLF (1992)

In 1992, dance/art band The KLF was awarded Best British Group (shared with Simply Red) and were booked to open the show. In an attempt to hijack the event, the duo collaborated with grindcore metal band Extreme Noise Terror to perform a death metal version of the dance song "3 a.m. Eternal", a performance that prompted conductor Sir Georg Solti to walk out in disgust. The performance ended with Bill Drummond firing blanks from a vintage machine gun over the audience and KLF publicist/announcer Scott Piering stating "Ladies and gentlemen, The KLF have now left the music business". Producers of the show then refused to let a motorcycle courier collect the award on behalf of the band. Later that evening, the KLF dumped a dead sheep outside the venue of an after-show party, whilst their Brit Award was reportedly found buried in a field near Stonehenge in 1993.

Michael Jackson and Jarvis Cocker (1996)
In 1996, Michael Jackson was given a special Artist of a Generation award. At the ceremony he accompanied his single "Earth Song" with a stage show, culminating with Jackson as a 'Christ-like figure' surrounded by children. Jarvis Cocker, of the band Pulp, mounted the stage in what he would later claim as a protest at this portion of the performance. Cocker ran across the stage, lifting his shirt and pointing his (clothed) backside in Jackson's direction. Cocker was subsequently questioned by the police but was told he would not be prosecuted.

Regarding his actions, Cocker said, "My actions were a form of protest at the way Michael Jackson sees himself as some kind of Christ-like figure with the power of healing. I just ran on the stage. I didn't make any contact with anyone as far as I recall."

Oasis and Blur rivalry (1996)
1996 saw the height of a well-documented feud between Oasis and fellow Britpop band Blur. The differing styles of the bands, coupled with their prominence within the Britpop movement, led the British media to seize upon the rivalry between the bands. Both factions played along, with the Gallaghers taunting Blur at the 1996 BRIT Awards by singing a rendition of "Parklife" when they collected their award for Best British Group (with Liam changing the lyrics to "Shite-life" and Noel changing them to "Marmite").

Chumbawamba and John Prescott (1998)

In 1998, Danbert Nobacon of the politically active band Chumbawamba threw a bucket of iced water over then-Deputy Prime Minister John Prescott. Despite apologies on behalf of the band from EMI Europe, Chumbawamba were unrepentant, saying, "If John Prescott has the nerve to turn up at events like the Brit Awards in a vain attempt to make Labour seem cool and trendy, then he deserves all we can throw at him."

Russell Brand (2007)
Some controversy was caused by the host of the 2007 awards ceremony, comedian Russell Brand, who made several quips relating to news stories of the time including Robbie Williams entering rehab for addiction to prescription drugs, the Queen's 'naughty bits' and a fatal friendly fire incident involving a British soldier killed by American armed forces in Iraq. ITV received over 300 complaint calls from viewers. He would again instigate controversy the following year at the 2008 MTV Video Music Awards.

Adele speech cut short (2012)
Adele won the British Album of the Year widely regarded as the most coveted award. Less than half a minute into her acceptance speech, host James Corden was forced to cut Adele off in order to introduce Blur who were due to perform an eleven-minute set as they had received the Outstanding Contribution to Music and the ceremony was running over its allotted time. Adele was visibly annoyed and proceeded to raise her middle finger and the producers of the show came under fire on Twitter for the decision. Following the incident Adele said "I got cut off during my speech for Best Album and I flung the middle finger. But that finger was to the suits at The BRIT Awards, not to my fans". Adele received an apology from the show's organisers, who stated; "We send our deepest apologies to Adele that her big moment was cut short. We don't want this to undermine her incredible achievement in winning our night's biggest award. It tops off what's been an incredible year for her." Due to the tight schedule, only three of the five songs Blur played were broadcast on ITV.

Alex Turner speech (2014)
On 2014 Arctic Monkeys won the British Album of the Year. When the band got up on stage to receive the award, lead singer Alex Turner, started his speech by testing the mic and then talked about the cyclical nature of rock music, saying that even if its popularity declines it will never die as a music genre, while the rest of the band laughed in the background. He ended the speech by saying, "Invoice me for the microphone if you need to", dropped it to the ground, and left the stage. That night they became the first act to win both British Album and British Group three times. The speech divided both press and audience, being labeled as both "pretentious twaddle" and a sincere defense of the genre, as well as garnering reactions from other musicians, with Johnny Marr saying it was “quite poetic”.  

When asked a few days later, Turner said, "In public, I'm a quiet guy, so doing anything in front of lots of people always makes me nervous. I'm known for my music, not how well I deliver a speech. People always assume if you're in a band that's been on the scene for ages that you're going to be really confident, but that's not true at all." In a 2016 interview with Rolling Stone, he re-addressed the speech, “A lot of people thought I was waffling away on drugs, but I wasn’t. I just can’t pretend getting an award was something I’ve dreamed about since I was a kid, because it isn’t.” In 2022 when an interviewer implied the speech was akin to performance art, Turner seemed to agree. Wet Leg's singer Rhian Teasdale quoted part of Turner's speech, during the 2023 ceremony, as the band won New Artist.

David Bowie enters Scottish independence debate (2014)
At 67 years of age, the influential musician David Bowie became the oldest recipient of now defunct British Male Solo Artist. Bowie used his acceptance speech, delivered in his absence by Kate Moss, to urge Scotland to remain part of the UK in the September 2014 Scottish independence referendum. His speech read: "I'm completely delighted to have a Brit for being the best male – but I am, aren't I Kate? Yes. I think it's a great way to end the day. Thank you very, very much and Scotland stay with us." Bowie's unusual intervention in British politics garnered a significant reaction throughout the UK on social media.

Little Mix Best British Group win and speech (2021) 
In 2021, Little Mix's win for British Group marked the first time a girl group had won that award since it was first introduced in 1977. Little Mix used their acceptance speech to call out white male dominance, misogyny, sexism and lack of diversity in the industry. Band member Leigh-Anne Pinnock stated “It’s not easy being a female in the U.K. pop industry. We’ve all seen the white male dominance, misogyny, sexism, and lack of diversity. We’re proud of how we’ve stuck together, stood for our group, surrounded ourselves with strong women, and are now using our voices more than ever." Little Mix also called out the awards ceremony for the lack of nominations and wins for female groups in the category while paying homage to "female bands" such as the Spice Girls, Sugababes, All Saints, and Girls Aloud etc, who all had made significant contributions to pop culture in the U.K, but were overlooked by the Brit Awards.

Notable performances

Spice Girls' performance of "Wannabe" and "Who Do You Think You Are" (1997)
Ginger Spice, Geri Halliwell, wore a Union Jack dress. Spicemania was at its height in the UK and the Spice Girls had just cracked the US as well, reaching number 1 with their debut single and album.
Halliwell was originally going to wear an all-black dress, but she thought it was too boring so her sister sewed on a Union Jack tea towel, with a 'peace' sign on the back. The now iconic red, white and blue mini-dress was worn during the Spice Girls' performance of their number one song "Who Do You Think You Are". In 1998 she sold her dress in a charity auction to Hard Rock Cafe in Las Vegas for a record £41,320, giving Halliwell the Guinness World Record for the most expensive piece of pop star clothing ever sold. This performance won the Spice Girls the award for "BRITs Hits 30 – Best Live Performance at The BRIT Awards" at the 2010 BRIT Awards, with Samantha Fox presenting the award to Geri Halliwell and Mel B.

Geri Halliwell's performance of "Bag It Up" (2000)
Three years following the iconic Spice Girls performance, Halliwell, now a solo artist, performed her new single "Bag It Up" at the 2000 BRIT Awards. The performance featured Halliwell emerging, whilst dancing on with a pole, from a pair of large inflatable female legs. As the performance continued, her male backing dancers stripped to their pink briefs whilst dancing with the Union Jack flag. It is widely believed that Halliwell lip-synced her performance. In addition to all this, the performance is famous for being performed on the same night that the Spice Girls received the award for Outstanding Contribution to Music, which Halliwell declined to accept with her former bandmates.

Gorillaz's performance of "Clint Eastwood" (2002)
When it was announced that past Brit Award recipient Damon Albarn, and his project Gorillaz, would be taking the stage at the 2002 Brit Awards, no one knew what to expect.  The four cartoon members of the band performed the song on giant life size screens (an early version of a 3D hologram) without the Blur frontman being present at all. The band performed their hit single "Clint Eastwood" alongside UK underground rap group Phi Life Cypher and a group of silhouetted female dancers mimicking the zombies from the band's music video. The performance received rapturous cheers and applause.

Girls Aloud's performance of "The Promise" (2009)
English-Irish girl group Girls Aloud marked their first ever performance at the 2009 ceremony, by performing their single "The Promise". The performance saw the members, Cheryl Cole, Kimberley Walsh, Sarah Harding, Nicola Roberts and Nadine Coyle appear as though they were naked, with their modesty being covered by pink feather fans. This performance was nominated in the 2010 ceremony for the "BRITs Hits 30 – Best Live Performance at The BRIT Awards", alongside Oasis and The Who, which the Spice Girls eventually went on to win.

Adele's performance of "Someone like You" (2011)
Adele performed her song "Someone like You" at the 2011 BRITs with only a piano accompanying her. Her emotional performance was received with a standing ovation at the O2 Arena and the video has received 187 million views so far on YouTube. The performance launched "Someone Like You" 46 spots up the UK charts to number one, and in the process, made Adele the first artist in the UK since The Beatles to have two top five singles and two top five albums at the same time. The performance had all lights down and focused on Adele and her piano.

Madonna's performance of "Living for Love" (2015)
Madonna's live return to BRIT Awards after 20 years was widely promoted in the media in the days leading up to the ceremony and during the show itself. During the performance of "Living for Love", she walked onstage wearing an oversized cape. When standing on stairs situated on the stage, the cape's cord failed to separate, so when Madonna's backing dancer pulled the cape behind her, she fell down the stairs and noticeably hit the stage hard. She paused momentarily as her backing music continued, before she managed to separate herself from the cape and then continued performing. In an interview on The Jonathan Ross Show, Madonna blamed her fall on a wardrobe malfunction as her cape had been tied too tightly so it could not be unfastened in time, before adding: "I had a little bit of whiplash, I smacked the back of my head. And I had a man standing over me with a flashlight until about 3am to make sure I was compos mentis. I know how to fall, I have fallen off my horse many times."

Katy Perry and Skip Marley's performance of "Chained to the Rhythm" (2017)

In the leadup to the 2016 U.S. presidential election, Katy Perry was a major endorsement for Democratic candidate Hillary Clinton, performing at many of her rallies and speaking at public events. After Donald Trump won the election, Perry returned to recording her fifth studio album and in February 2017 released "Chained to the Rhythm". During the performance, she was joined onstage by two large skeletal puppets dressed as Trump and British Prime Minister Theresa May. The performance was also notable as a backing dancer fell offstage at the end of the performance whilst wearing a house costume.

Anne-Marie's performance of "Kiss My (Uh-Oh)" (2022)
During Anne-Marie's performance of "Kiss My (Uh-Oh)", she stepped out of a giant model of a heart but while she was stepping down the stairs, she let go of one of her dancer's hands and tripped. People compared the scene to a "Madonna moment" and Anne-Marie herself joked about it on Twitter saying: "Didn't need my left ankle anyway."

Categories

Current

 British Album of the Year
 British Artist of the Year
 British Single of the Year
 British Producer of the Year
 British Group
 Best New Artist
 Songwriter of the Year
 British Pop/R&B Act
 British Dance Act
 British Rock/Alternative Act
 British Hip Hop/Rap/Grime Act
 Rising Star Award
 International Solo Artist
 International Group
 International Song

Defunct

 British Artist Video of the Year (1985–2021)
 British Male Solo Artist (1977, 1982–2021)
 British Female Solo Artist (1977, 1982–2021)
 British Live Act (2005–2009, 2013)
 Classical Recording (1982–1993)
 Classical Soloist Album (1977)
 Comedy Recording (1985)
 International Album (1977, 2002–2011)
 International Artist (1983–1985)
 International Male Solo Artist (1989–2021)
 International Female Solo Artist (1989–2021)
 International Breakthrough Act (1988–2012)
 Non-Musical Recording (1977)
 Orchestral Album (1977)
 Soundtrack/Cast Recording (1985–2001)

Special

 Artist of a Generation (1996)
 Biggest Selling Album Act (1998)
 Biggest Selling Album & Single of 1993 (1994)
 Biggest Selling Live Act of 1999 (2000)
 British Album of 30 Year (2010)
 British Song of 25 Year (2005)
 Freddie Mercury Award (1996, 1998–1999)
 Global Success Award (2013–2019)
 Icon Award (2014, 2016–2017, 2021)
 Lifetime Achievement Award (1983, 1989)
 Live Performance of 30 Year (2010)
 Most Successful Live Act (1993)
 Outstanding Contribution to Music (1977, 1982–1988, 1990–2010, 2012, 2019)
 Sony Trophy Award for Technical Excellence (1983–1984)
 Special Award (1983, 1985)
 Special Recognition (2013)

Voting procedure
According to The BRIT Awards website, the list of eligible artists, albums, and singles is compiled by the Official Charts Company and submitted to the voting academy, which consists of over 1,000 members of the music industry, including the previous year's nominees and winners. The voters use a secure online website to vote, and the voting is scrutinized by Electoral Reform Services. The concept of fan voting was abolished after the 2019 Brit Awards, but brought back in 2022.

Performances
Coldplay is the act with most performances ever, with five opening presentations and eight overall, followed by Take That and band member Robbie Williams, who performed seven times each. Adele has performed at five ceremonies, the most amongst female artists.

Most successful acts

There have been numerous acts, both groups and individuals, that have won multiple awards. The table below shows those that have won four or more awards.

Viewing figures

See also
 Classic BRIT Awards

References

General references

Inline citations

External links

 

 
1977 establishments in the United Kingdom
Awards established in 1977
British music awards
ITV (TV network) original programming
BBC Television shows
BBC Radio 1 programmes
Annual events in the United Kingdom